The Social Democratic Front (SDF) was a political party in Ghana during the Third Republic (1979–81).

In the 1979 Ghanaian general election held on 18 June 1979, SDF presidential candidate Ibrahim Mahama won 3.7% of the vote and the party won three of 140 seats in the National Assembly.

1979 establishments in Ghana
Defunct political parties in Ghana
Political parties established in 1979
Political parties with year of disestablishment missing
Social democratic parties in Ghana